Marcus Nonius Macrinus was a Roman senator and general during the reigns of the Emperors Antoninus Pius, Lucius Verus, and Marcus Aurelius. Macrinus was suffect consul in the nundinium of April-June 154 as the colleague of [Prifernius ?] Paetus.

According to his tomb's inscriptions, he was originally from Brescia (Brixia). He was an advisor to Marcus Aurelius. Nonius Macrinus served as legate of Pannonia Inferior (c. 152-c. 154), Pannonia Superior (c. 159-c. 162) and proconsul of the Roman province of Asia (170/171).

Family 
His wife may have been named Arria (as well as having a second nomen which may have been Flavia or Manlia) based on inscriptions.

Tomb 
In October 2008, Nonius Macrinus' tomb was discovered by archaeologists on the banks of the river Tiber, near the Via Flaminia north of Rome.
In December 2012, in light of a lack of reconstruction funding, his tomb was reburied in order to preserve its fragile marble.

In popular culture
Macrinus' life inspired Russell Crowe's character Maximus Decimus Meridius in the 2000 feature film Gladiator.
Marcus Nonius Macrinus and the fictitious Maximus Decimus Meridius are placed within the same time period. Further, both Marcus and the fictitious Maximus are liked and well known by Marcus Aurelius. However, Marcus Nonius Macrinus went on to enjoy a successful career and died a wealthy man. In contrast, the character Maximus Decimus Meridius loses his family and is sold into slavery.

References

External links

2nd-century Romans
People from the Metropolitan City of Rome Capital
People from the Province of Brescia
Macrinus, Marcus
Ancient Roman generals
Suffect consuls of Imperial Rome
Roman governors of Pannonia Inferior
Roman governors of Pannonia Superior
Roman governors of Asia